Bishunpur Baladhari is a village in Hajipur, vaishali district, Bihar state of India.

Geography
This panchayat is located at

Panchayat office
samudayik bhawan Bala Dhari (समुदाियक भवन Bala Dhari )

Nearest City/Town
Hajipur (Distance 8 km)

Nearest major road highway or river
SH 74 (State highway 74)

Compass

Villages in panchayat
The following villages are in this panchayat:

References

Gram panchayats in Bihar
Villages in Vaishali district
Vaishali district
Hajipur